Hilary Jane McPhee  (born 1941) is an Australian writer and editor. She was awarded an Order of Australia for service to the Arts in 2003.

Biography 
McPhee was born in 1941. She is a graduate of the University of Melbourne. 

She was a founding director, with Diana Gribble, of McPhee Gribble Publishers, 1975–89, and Chair of the Australia Council for the Arts and of the Major Organizations Board 1994-7, a founding director and sometime editor of online political newsletter NewMatilda.com. She has an honorary doctorate from Monash University, was the inaugural Vice-Chancellor's Fellow at the University of Melbourne and remains a senior Fellow of the University.

From 2006-10 she was living and working between the Middle East and Italy, writing a book about the region and articles about matching philanthropic initiatives to the needs of young people. Her marriage in 1986 to writer Don Watson ended in divorce in 2009.

Other People's Words, published in 2001, documents her publishing life. Her selection of Australian writing, Wordlines, was published in 2010. She annotated and edited film maker Tim Burstall's diaries from the early 1950s, published by MUP as Memoirs of a Young Bastard:  the Diaries of Tim Burstall.

Other People's Houses, is a memoir, it was published by MUP in November 2019.

She was awarded an Order of Australia for service to the Arts in 2003.

Private life 
She married artist Peter Freeman in 1964 with whom she has a daughter, Sara Harriet Freeman, and a son, Rupert. In 1976 she married publisher, John Michie with whom she has a son, James.

Bibliography
 Other People's Words (2001, Picador) 
 Wordlines: Contemporary Australian Writing editor, (2010, Five Mile Press) 
Other People's Houses (2019, MUP)

References

External links

1941 births
Living people
Place of birth missing (living people)
Australian publishers (people)
Officers of the Order of Australia
Meanjin people